The Boer War Memorial in Woolwich is opposite the Royal Artillery Barracks on Grand Depot Road in Woolwich. The memorial marks the deaths of the 18 soldiers of the 61st Battery Royal Field Artillery who died in the Second Boer War. The memorial is a tall thin pink granite obelisk on a square plinth with a three-step base.

The memorial has been Grade II listed on the National Heritage List for England since 1973.

References

Grade II listed buildings in the Royal Borough of Greenwich
Grade II listed monuments and memorials
Military memorials in London
Woolwich
1903 establishments in England
1903 in London
Granite sculptures in the United Kingdom
Buildings and structures completed in 1903
Second Boer War memorials
Obelisks in England